Redwood Materials, Inc. is an American company headquartered in Carson City, Nevada. The company aims to recycle lithium-ion batteries and produce battery materials for electromobility and electrical storage systems. Redwood Materials was reported to have a valuation of about $3.7 billion as of July 2021.

History 
Redwood Materials was founded by J. B. Straubel, who was a co-founder and served as chief technology officer at Tesla, Inc. for 16 years. Redwood set out to create a circular supply chain for electric vehicles and clean energy products, making them more sustainable long term and driving down the cost for batteries by developing a fully closed loop for lithium-ion batteries. Redwood sought to recycle batteries, recapturing valuable materials to help make new batteries.

On its website in 2022 Redwood Materials explained that the company received enough end-of-life batteries annually to provide critical materials for new batteries for about 60,000 new electric vehicles. Redwood estimated that it was recovering more than 95% of the metals (including nickel, cobalt, lithium, and copper) from end-of-life batteries.

Redwood then produces strategic battery materials, supplying battery manufacturing partners with anode copper foil and cathode active materials.

Redwood is partnered with companies such as Panasonic, Ford Motor Company, and Amazon.

Along with Ford and Volvo, Redwood Materials launched a used battery collection program for the state of California in February of 2022. Ford, Volvo and their dealers planned to work with battery dismantlers and ship old vehicle batteries to Redwood Material's plant in Carson City, Nevada.

In 2021, the company announced it had received US$775M from various investors in a financing round. This will be used to build a production facility that will produce battery materials from recycled materials, starting at 6 GWh per year. By 2025, the capacity of the production facilities is to be expanded to 100 GWh, enough for one million electric vehicles. By 2030, capacity is expected to increase to 500 GWh.

Investors 
Investors in Redwood Materials' $775M Series C include T. Rowe Price, Goldman Sachs, Baillie Gifford, Fidelity, Ford Motor Company and Amazon's Climate Pledge Fund.

References 

Companies established in 2017
Companies based in Carson City, Nevada
Battery recycling
Waste management companies of the United States